Epworth originally referred to Epworth, Lincolnshire, a town in England that was the birthplace of John Wesley and Charles Wesley, early leaders of the Methodist religious movement. The town's name has since been used for other places and institutions affiliated with the Methodist denomination of Christianity.

In addition to the English town, Epworth may refer to:

Places

Canada
 Epworth, Newfoundland and Labrador, a hamlet, Burin Peninsula, Newfoundland
 Epworth Park, a neighborhood in Grand Bay-Westfield, New Brunswick

United States
 Epworth, Georgia, an unincorporated community
 Epworth by the Sea, Georgia, a Methodist retreat center
 Epworth, Illinois, a town
 Epworth, Iowa, a town near Dubuque
 Epworth, Missouri, an unincorporated community
 Epworth Heights, Michigan, a summer resort in Ludington, Michigan
 Epworth, Virginia, an unincorporated community

Zimbabwe
 Epworth, Zimbabwe, a city and suburb of Harare
 Epworth (constituency), a constituency of the Zimbabwean parliament

Buildings
 Epworth Hall (disambiguation), several buildings
 Epworth Hospital in Melbourne, Australia 
 Epworth Military Academy (1857–1928), a defunct military academy in Epworth, Iowa
 Epworth School, a private school in Scottsville, Pietermaritzburg, KwaZulu-Natal, South Africa
 Epworth School (Epworth, Iowa) (1917–2011), a Colonial Revival/Romanesque Revival building in Epworth, Iowa, United States

Other uses 
 Epworth League, a youth organization of the American Methodist Episcopal church
 Epworth sleepiness scale, used in the diagnosis of sleep apnea
 Friar Lane & Epworth F.C., a football (soccer) club, Aylestone, Leicestershire, England